Islam is the religion of a majority of the Cham (also called Khmer Islam) and Malay minorities in Cambodia.  According to Po Dharma, there were 150,000 to 200,000 Muslims in Cambodia as late as 1975. Persecution under the Khmer Rouge eroded their numbers, however, and by the late 1980s they probably had not regained their former strength. In 2009, the Pew Research Center estimated that 1.6% of the population, or 236,000 people were Muslims.  Like other Muslim Cham people, those in Cambodia are Sunni Muslims of the Shafi'i denomination and following the Maturidi doctrine. Po Dharma divides the Muslim Cham in Cambodia into a traditionalist branch and an orthodox branch. (see Islam in Vietnam)

Demography 
In 2009, the Pew Research Center estimated that 1.6% of the population, or 236,000 people were Muslims. According to from general Population census results of the Kingdom of Cambodia 2019, there are around 311,045 Muslims in the country as of 2019. As of 2016, data from the Ministry also recorded 884 mosques scattered all throughout Cambodia.

Background of Early Islam
The Chams originated from the Kingdom of Champa. After Vietnam invaded and conquered Champa, Cambodia granted refuge to Cham Muslims escaping from Vietnamese conquest.

According to some accounts the Chams first contact with Islam was with one of the fathers-in-law of Prophet Muhammad, who is Jahsh, the father of Zaynab bint Jahsh. It was in the wake of many Sahabas who arrived in Indo-China in 617-18 from Abyssinia by sea route.

In 1642, King Ramathipadi I ascended the throne of Cambodia and converted to Islam, becoming the only Muslim ruler of Cambodia. After the massacre of Dutch VOC representatives and the expulsion of the VOC from Cambodia, popular discontentment from the majority Buddhist populace deposed him with the aid of the Nguyen lords in 1658, causing much instability in Cambodia in the years following his reign.

Cham Muslims
The Cham have their own mosques. In 1962 there were about 100 mosques in the country. At the end of the nineteenth century, the Muslims in Cambodia formed a unified community under the authority of four religious dignitaries—mupti, tuk kalih, raja kalik, and tvan pake. A council of notables in Cham villages consisted of one hakem and several katip, bilal, and labi. The four high dignitaries and the hakem were exempt from personal taxes, and they were invited to take part in major national ceremonies at the royal court. When Cambodia became independent, the Islamic community was placed under the control of a five-member council that represented the community in official functions and in contacts with other Islamic communities. Each Muslim community has a hakem who leads the community and the mosque, an imam who leads the prayers, and a bilal who calls the faithful to the daily prayers. The peninsula of Chrouy Changvar near Phnom Penh is considered the spiritual center of the Cham, and several high Muslim officials reside there. Each year some of the Cham go to study the Qur'an at Kelantan in Malaysia, and some go on to study in, or make a pilgrimage to, Mecca. According to figures from the late 1950s, about 7 percent of the Cham had completed the pilgrimage and could wear the fez or turban as a sign of their accomplishment.

The traditional Cham retain many ancient Muslim or pre-Muslim traditions and rites. They consider Allah as the all-powerful God, but they also recognize other non-Islamic practices. They are closer, in many respects, to the Cham of coastal Vietnam than they are to other Muslims. The religious dignitaries of the traditional Cham (and of the Cham in Vietnam) dress completely in white, and they shave their heads and faces. These Cham believe in the power of magic and sorcery, and they attach great importance to magical practices in order to avoid sickness or slow or violent death. They believe in many supernatural powers. Although they show little interest in the pilgrimage to Mecca and in the five daily prayers, the traditional Cham do celebrate many Muslim festivals and rituals.

The orthodox Cham have adopted a more conformist religion largely because of their close contacts with, and intermarriages with, the Malay community. In fact, the orthodox Cham have adopted Malay customs and family organization, and many speak the Malay language. They send pilgrims to Mecca, and they attend international Islamic conferences. Conflicts between the traditional and the orthodox Cham increased between 1954 and 1975. For example, the two groups polarized the population of one village, and each group eventually had its own mosque and separate religious organization.

Chvea Muslims 
The Chvea arrived in Cambodia in the 14th century from the Malay Peninsula and Indonesia, and traditionally occupied the coastal part of the country.  Some scholars have suggested that inter-marriage between the two groups has served to forge a singular Muslim community, while others identify two distinct groups.

Persecution

Persecution of the Cham in Cambodia took place mainly during the Khmer Rouge regime from 1975 to 1979. The Khmer Rouge gained had control over the Democratic Kampuchea (DK) after defeating the Khmer Republic forces in 1975. Under its leader Pol Pot, the Khmer Rouge – formally known as the Communist Party of Kampuchea (CPK) – set to redefine the policies of the Democratic Kampuchea through its agrarian and inward-looking economic-political outlook. This resulted in the massive relocation of the masses from urban areas to the countryside where they were forced to work in the fields every day with little food and rest. On top of that, the Khmer Rouge regime began to systematically dismantle the socioeconomic structures of the people and screen them based on their political, religious, and ethnic backgrounds in order to maintain socio-political order based on Pol Pot’s communist ideals. Buddhism, which was then the dominant faith group in Cambodian society, was repressed; the monks were made to be defrocked and sent to work in the fields. Scholars and historians have differed in the definite number of victims, but have estimated that nearly one-third of the Cambodian population than were estimated to have been killed by the regime or died out of starvation and disease - bringing the total number to be between the ranges of 1.05 million to 2.2 million lives. The Cham were also not spared from persecution, torture, and death under the hands of the regime.

David Chandler opined that, although ethnic minorities fell victim to the Khmer Rouge regime, they were not targeted specifically because of their ethnic backgrounds, but rather because they were mostly enemies of the revolution (Kiernan, 2002:252; see also the footnote on Chandler’s The Tragedy of Cambodian History, pp. 4, 263-65, 285). Furthermore, Chandler also rejects the use of the terms “chauvinism” and “genocide” just to avoid drawing possible parallels to Hitler. This indicates that Chandler does not believe in the argument of charging the Khmer Rouge regime with the crime of genocide. Similarly, Michael Vickery holds a similar position to Chandler’s, and refuses to acknowledge the atrocities of the Khmer Rouge regime as genocide; Vickery regarded the Khmer Rouge a “chauvinist” regime, due to its anti-Vietnam and anti-religion policies (Kiernan, 2002:252; see Vickery’s Cambodia 1975-1982, pp. 181–82, 255, 258, 264-65). Stephen Heder also conceded that the Khmer Rouge were not guilty of genocide, stating that the atrocities of the regime were not motivated by race (Kiernan, 2002:252; see Heder’s From Pol Pot to Pen Sovan to the Villages, p. 1).

Ben Kiernan makes the argument that it was indeed genocide and disagrees with the three scholars, by bringing forth examples from the history of the Cham people in Cambodia, as did an international tribunal finding Nuon Chea and Khieu Samphan guilty 92 and 87 counts of said crime respectively

Today
Islam is an officially recognised religion in the country. Muslims practice their religion normally and out in the open. This commenced in the People Republic of Kampuchea era where religions were restored and allowed to be practiced again. The Chams also enjoy democratic rights like all Khmer citizens, with the right to vote and be elected as politicians. The government also sponsors annual iftar gatherings during the holy Islamic month of Ramadan. In 2018, the leader of the Organisation of Islamic Cooperation (OIC) called Cambodia a ‘beacon for Muslim coexistence.’

Notable Muslims

 Amath Yashya

See also
 Cham people
 Islam in Vietnam
 Utsuls
 Kampong Cham Province

References